LV is the first live album by American hard rock band Chickenfoot. It was originally released as a bonus to a packaging of the first two Chickenfoot studio albums, and was eventually released on its own. The first "side" includes tracks from the 2012 "Different Devil" tour. "Side B" includes tracks from the band's first tour that were also included in the DVD release, "Get Your Buzz On".

Title
"LV" is a shorthand play on the word "live", but also plays into the album naming scheme adopted by Chickenfoot, using out-of-sequence roman numerals. LV happens to represent "55" as a Roman numeral, playing off of lead singer Hagar's biggest solo hit.

Track listing

Personnel
Chickenfoot
Sammy Hagar – lead vocals, rhythm guitar
Joe Satriani – lead guitar, keyboards, piano
Michael Anthony – bass guitar, backing vocals
Chad Smith – drums, percussion on tracks 5–9
Kenny Aronoff – drums, percussion on tracks 1–4
Michael "Ace" Baker – recording

2012 live albums
Chickenfoot live albums
MNRK Music Group live albums
Edel SE & Co. KGaA live albums